Burroughs–Foland Farm is a historic home and farm located at Livingston, Columbia County, New York.  The main farmhouse was built in 1908, and is a -story, Mission Revival style, stuccoed hollow tile dwelling.  It features a full-width, tripartite arched front porch, flanking side porches, and hipped roof of red barrel tile.  Also on the property are the contributing carriage house (1908); original frame farmhouse (c. 1840, c. 1885, 1908); barn, cow stable, and silo (c. 1840–1860); truck and tractor building (c. 1870–1880); stable and carriage house (c. 1840–1860); piggery (c. 1860); engine house (c. 1908); and small dwelling house (c. 1910–1920).

It was added to the National Register of Historic Places in 2014.

References 

Farms on the National Register of Historic Places in New York (state)
Mission Revival architecture in New York (state)
Houses completed in 1908
Houses in Columbia County, New York
National Register of Historic Places in Columbia County, New York
1908 establishments in New York (state)
U.S. Route 9